Miguel Ángel Cevasco Abad (born April 27, 1986) is a Peruvian former footballer who played as a midfielder.

Club career
Cevasco began his career with Universitario de Deportes one of the most popular clubs in Peru. He played there from 2004 to 2008.

International career
Since 2005, Cevasco has earned 9 caps with the Peruvian national team and scored one goal.

Honours
 Universitario de Deportes:
 Torneo Apertura: 2008

References

External links

Miguel Cevasco at footballdatabase.eu

1986 births
Living people
Footballers from Lima
Association football midfielders
Peruvian footballers
Peru international footballers
Peruvian Primera División players
Club Universitario de Deportes footballers
Hapoel Ironi Kiryat Shmona F.C. players
Juan Aurich footballers
José Gálvez FBC footballers
Universidad Técnica de Cajamarca footballers
Sport Victoria players
Israeli Premier League players
León de Huánuco footballers
Peruvian expatriate footballers
Expatriate footballers in Israel